Wildwood School is an independent progressive K–12 school located in Los Angeles. Wildwood was founded as an elementary school in 1971, by a group of parents led by a young lawyer named Belle Mason. The secondary campus (middle and high school) opened in 2000. The elementary campus is located in Los Angeles and the middle and upper school campus is located in West Los Angeles. There are approximately 300 students in grades K-5, the elementary campus, and 400 in grades 6–12 at the middle and upper school campus.

Brief history 

In the 1970s and 1980s, the school was housed in one building on Olympic Boulevard in Santa Monica, where the current campus for New Roads School is located. The first graduating elementary class had only ten students. In 1991 Hope Boyd, previously the Middle School Head of Westlake School for Girls, became the head of Wildwood, and the following year the elementary campus relocated to its current Culver City location. Boyd began to stabilize Wildwood's academic course and solidified its reputation, and under her watch the school doubled the size of the student body. In 1999, the Board of Trustees decided to create a middle and upper school. The school was to be based on the principles of the Coalition of Essential Schools and teach project-based equitable learning. The middle and upper school opened in 2000 on Olympic Boulevard in West Los Angeles, in a small and limiting former warehouse, with no windows (which has become a subject of humor amongst Wildwood students), mercurial temperature controls, and only 100 students. George Wood, a respected national educator and principal of Federal Hocking High School in Ohio, was the founding director of the secondary school. The full remodeling of the middle and upper school building was finished in 2002.

Philosophy 
At the elementary school, Wildwood incorporates multi-age primary classes. For kindergarten and first grade, students learn together in "Pods". The reasoning behind this is that the older children can influence and lead the younger children, starting at a very young age. The elementary school encourages parent participation and every week during "all school meetings" parents are invited to be updated on school news and events. Multi-age continues in the middle and upper school through blended "advisories".

At the middle and upper school, students receive narrative assessments rather than letter grades. Narrative assessments are comprehensive reports written by the teacher specific to each of "The Habits of Mind and Heart". These assessments are converted into a cumulative GPA which is calculated in grades 9 through 12 to facilitate the college process. Teachers assess the students on their academic work and a set of principles known as The Habits of Mind and Heart. "The Habits" are derived from a national organization known as the Coalition of Essential Schools and focus on the student as a person in addition to an academic. The academic program at Wildwood School is centered on "project-based learning". Students are assigned both short- and long-term projects throughout the year.

The middle and upper school "Advisory" system provides a foundation for student development. Advisories composed of 12-15 students and one advisor with mixed groups of 7th and 8th graders, 9th and 10th graders, and 11th and 12th graders meet four mornings per week for one hour. Sixth grade is considered a transitional year from elementary to middle school and 6th grade advisories are composed only of 6th graders. Specific curriculum is developed for Advisory such as the school's multicultural programming, timely current world events, and programs that focus the development of the individual. Advisory also provides time for students to work on homework and to consult with teachers during consultancy periods scheduled during Advisory. Advisory also provides time for students to relax and meet with peers and teachers before the start of the school day.

Wildwood encourages a collaborative learning environment. It offers honors courses in grades 9-12 but does not offer Advanced Placement classes, nor are AP credits from other institutions recognized. Rather, Wildwood students demonstrate their cumulative learning through hour long presentations known as "Gateways" at the end of 8th and 10th grade. Students present a cumulative "Senior exhibition" at the end of 12th grade. In all middle and upper school grades, parent teacher conferences are held three times a year (twice a year during the years of gateway/exhibition) with the student's advisor. The conferences seek to address the student's academic and social development, and constitutes planning and goals for the future. Students are required to prepare for the conference by assessing their 'strengths' and 'stretches' which they then present during their conferences.

Community involvement and internship 
Part of the curriculum of Wildwood includes working with local social service agencies, including St. Joseph Center and the Westside Children's Center. Middle and upper school students are required to participate in these activities during school hours for 3 hours a week.

In addition, juniors and seniors must participate in the internship program for four hours a week. As a result, students receive real world job training during school hours. Many students say that the Internship program was the best part of their Wildwood experience.

Upper school students also have an opportunity to go on International Community Involvement trips during spring break. Destinations have included Nepal, Uruguay, Guatemala, and Bulgaria.

Outreach Center 
In 2001, the Bill & Melinda Gates Foundation granted Wildwood the funds to create an Outreach Center. The mission of the Outreach Center is to support the creation, development, and enhancement of small, personalized, learner-centered schools in Southern California and throughout the nation. The center was given a huge boost in 2004, when the Los Angeles Unified School District gave its public schools two years to break down into smaller schools. As a result, Wildwood's Outreach Center has held numerous professional development workshops educating public school teachers and administrators on the elements of successful small schools including, Advisory Programs, Project-Based Learning, Habits of Mind and Heart and Portfolios and Exhibitions. In addition, Wildwood School was named a Coalition of Essential Schools mentor school in 2004 - a recognition of Wildwood's work with other schools. In 2005, Wildwood received a National Association of Independent Schools Leading Edge award for the outreach work it has done with public and charter schools nationwide.

Wildwood Athletics
The Wildwood Wolves have middle school and high school varsity teams including: Cross Country, Girls Volleyball, Boys/Girls Basketball, Boys/Girls Soccer, Baseball, Swim, and Track and Field. The school offers other sports such as Boys/Girls Tennis, and flag football. A number of Wildwood Varsity High School teams have gone on to CIF playoffs and league championships including Boys Baseball, Boys Basketball, Girls Volleyball, and Boys Soccer. Middle school sports teams have a "no cut" policy and all students are allowed to play. At the elementary school 4th and 5th grade sports are offered. The teams all follow the "no cut" policy.

Wildwood Arts
Wildwood is well known for its arts programs.

Performing Arts
Wildwood has performed a number of plays/musicals since it opened. Students of all ages have had opportunities to act, assistant direct, stage manage, and work on technical elements such as lighting and sound design.

In addition, every spring Wildwood has a repertoire of student-directed plays, in which seniors apply to direct a one-act play of their choice. The performing arts teachers pick four of the applicants to create the repertoire. Students have also written plays in the past.

Music
Wildwood's music program allows students to experiment with different instruments and to compose their own work. Every year, there is a Wildwood Cabaret, in which students perform music. Additional performances are held by grade level. There is also a music production class for high-school students which allows the students to learn how to use software to produce, mix, and edit music.

Visual Arts
Wildwood is abundant with paintings and sculptures. At the middle and upper school campus, there is a Gallery Space, in which students have an opportunity to curate shows of their artwork for anyone who walks in to see.

Electives
In addition to the Arts, there are many other electives that high school students can take. Some of these include Technical Theater, Film making, Creative Writing, Government and Politics, and Advanced Topics in Math and Science. Wildwood offers a class that mixes Math and Science that is called STEM (Science, Technology, Engineering and Math).

Notable alumni

 Ella Emhoff  Second Daughter of the United States
 Zoe Kazan  American actress
 Amandla Stenberg  American actress
 Rumer Willis  American actress

References

External links 
 

Coalition of Essential Schools
Educational institutions established in 1971
Private elementary schools in California
High schools in Los Angeles
Private middle schools in California
Private high schools in California
1971 establishments in California